Madras Rajagopalan Radhakrishnan Vasudevan was an Indian actor who was active in Tamil cinema and theatre during the latter half of the 20th century. He was known for playing negative roles, but he was also a successful character actor. He acted in over 75 movies in Tamil. He is the eldest son of yesteryear actor M. R. Radha, father of Vasu Vikram and half-brother of Radha Ravi, Raadhika and Nirosha.

Filmography

References

External links
 

20th-century Indian male actors
Male actors in Tamil cinema
1984 deaths
Tamil male actors
Male actors from Chennai
Indian male stage actors
1942 births